Pirdeh (also Romanized as Pīrdeh; also known as Fīrdeh and Darreh Deh) is a village in Poshtkuh Rural District, in the Central District of Firuzkuh County, Tehran Province, Iran. At the 2006 census, its population was 272, in 59 families.

References 

Populated places in Firuzkuh County